WAYH (88.1 FM, "Way FM") is a non-commercial educational radio station licensed to serve Harvest, Alabama, United States. The station serves the greater Huntsville / Decatur area and is owned and operated by the WAY-FM Network. WAYH broadcasts a youth-oriented Contemporary Christian music format. The station's programming is also carried by broadcast translators, including one serving downtown Florence at 99.5 FM.

History
This station received its original construction permit from the Federal Communications Commission on April 16, 2002. The new station was assigned the call letters WAYH by the FCC on April 24, 2002. WAYH received its license to cover from the FCC on March 11, 2003.

Personalities
Notable local on-air personalities include morning show host Jack Davis. Davis also serves as operations manager for the station. Other notable weekday personalities include morning show co-host Wendy, midday host Jeff Connell, and afternoon host Donna Cruz. The syndicated Total Axxess program from Nashville, Tennessee, airs on weekday evenings.

Community involvement
The station operates an outreach program called "Christmas Prayers" to help needy families in the Tennessee Valley during the Christmas holiday season. The program, started in December 2003, accepts e-mailed nominations by co-workers, neighbors, or relatives of the families.

Awards and honors
In March 2007, WAYH program director Ace McKay was named as a finalist for the Echo Award for Program Director of the Year (Markets 101+) by the Christian Music Broadcasters.

Translators

References

External links
WAYH official website

AYH
Contemporary Christian radio stations in the United States
Radio stations established in 2003
WAY-FM Network
AYH
2003 establishments in Alabama